Quick House may refer to:

William LaFayette Quick House, New Market, Alabama, listed on the Alabama Register of Landmarks and Heritage
James A. and Lottie J. (Congdon) Quick House, Gaylord, Michigan
Martin A. Quick House, Bath, New York, listed on the National Register of Historic Places
John Herbert Quick House, Morgan County, West Virginia